Steven Christopher Thomason (born December 30, 1972) is an American lawyer, former Arkansas state representative, former prosecutor, former chancellor of the University of Arkansas Community College at Hope, and current UA System Vice President for Planning and Development. He is a member of the Democratic Party.

Personal life and education
He is the son of Harland E. and Suzanne Cox Thomason.

He graduated from Hope High School in Hope, Arkansas in 1991.

He earned a Bachelor of Arts in Criminal Justice from the University of Arkansas at Little Rock in 1995 and a Juris Doctor from the William H. Bowen School of Law in 1998.

Career
Thomason practiced law in Hope in 1998 and later became a member of the Wright, Burke, Thomason and Graham Law Firm until the end of 2002. In 2003, he opened his own private practice law office in Hope.

He served as the deputy prosecuting attorney for Arkansas's 8th Judicial Circuit North from 1999-2002, and served as the prosecuting attorney from 2006-2008. In between his two stints as a prosecutor, he served two terms in the Arkansas House of Representatives (2003-2007). Thomason became chancellor of the University of Arkansas Community College at Hope in 2008.

Thomason has been mentioned as a potential candidate for Arkansas's 4th congressional district and for governor.

References

1972 births
People from Bowie County, Texas
Living people
University of Arkansas at Little Rock alumni
William H. Bowen School of Law alumni
Arkansas lawyers
Democratic Party members of the Arkansas House of Representatives